is a national public university administered by the government of Japan. It has five campuses in Hokkaido, Japan.

The main campus is on the outskirts of Sapporo, the capital of Hokkaido. Hokkaido University of Education, Sapporo (HUES) is the largest with a little over 1000 students. Other campuses are in Asahikawa, Kushiro, Hakodate, and Iwamizawa.

HUE is primarily dedicated to training teachers, and each of the campuses have associated public schools where students may practice teaching.

References

External links 
 

Universities and colleges in Hokkaido
Japanese national universities
1949 establishments in Japan
Educational institutions established in 1949
Teachers colleges in Japan